Belas is an city and one of the nine municipalities that make up the province of Luanda, as per the new administrative division of the province (the others being, Luanda, Cazenga, Cacuaco, Viana, Icolo e Bengo and Quiçama).

Belas was created by an administrative reform voted by the Angolan parliament on March 31, 2011. The administrative center is neighborhood Quilamba and the municipality administrator is Mrs. Joana Antónia Quintas.

Geography

Demography
The municipality has a population of 1,271,854 (2019) with a population density of 1,216/km2.

Administrative Division

See also
 List of lighthouses in Angola

References

External links
 Official Government Page

Municipalities in Luanda
Populated places in Luanda Province
Lighthouses in Angola